Jean-Claude Raphael (born 5 March 1973) is a Mauritian judoka.

Raphael represented Mauritius at the Atlanta Olympics in 1996 and achieved 9th at the Sydney Olympics in 2000. He is a Commonwealth Games Gold medalist, Indian Ocean Games Gold medalist, African Judo Championship Gold medalist and has competed internationally for many years before retiring from professional competition after the Sydney Olympic Games.

Achievements

See also
Judo Inside 
SportsReference.com

References

External links
 

1973 births
Living people
Mauritian male judoka
Judoka at the 2000 Summer Olympics
Olympic judoka of Mauritius
Competitors at the 1999 All-Africa Games
African Games medalists in judo
African Games silver medalists for Mauritius